Kalinga is a suburb in the City of Brisbane, Queensland, Australia.

Geography 

Kalinga is bounded by Kedron Brook to the north. The Kedron Brook bikeway follows the brook on the suburb's north-east boundary with two bridges over the creek to Shaw Park in Wavell Heights and to Toombul Terrace in Nundah. There is a third bridge over the creek from the bikeway (but not part of the bikeway) to Carew and New Street in Nundah.

The M7 Airport Link passes under the suburb through a tunnel.

The land use is predemoniantly residential with the remainder of the suburb being parks. It has a mix of small apartment blocks and houses, with some older style Queenslanders still extant.

History 

The name Kalinga derives from Aboriginal word Ngalinnga ("ngalin-nga"), probably from the Yuggera language, Turrbal dialect, meaning belonging to us.

This area is notable for the original residence of Alfred Lutwyche, known as Kedron Lodge.

On Saturday 8 October 1888, auctioneers Arthur Martin and Co offered 220 allotments for sale in the Kedron Park Estate, formerly part of the land owned by the then late Justice Alfred Lutwyche and in the vicinity of Park Road, Judge Road and Station Road.

An open air-movie theatre opened circa 1920 at 70 Lodge Street. It was enclosed circa 1929. It seated 400 to 500 people. It was variously known as the Kalinga Picture Palace, Kalinga Picture Theatre Kalinga Theatre and the Star Theatre. It burned down in the early 1960s and a Mobil petrol station was built on the site.

On Saturday 23 October 1920, Brigadier-General L.C. Wilson officially opened the war memorial gates at Kalinga Park at the end of Park Street to commemorate the service of local men in World War I. Between 200 and 300 people attended the ceremony. The gates were designed by Andrew Lang Petrie who also did the carving of the Helidon sandstone while the steelwork was done by Mr Rodgers.

Between 1927 and 1962, an electric tram service operated by the Brisbane City Council served the suburb, branching off the Chermside line at Kedron Park Road.

On Sunday 5 February 1928, a Presbyterian Hall was opened in Kalinga by Moderator W.C. Radcliffe.

On Sunday 23 July 1933, Archbishop James Duhig officially blessed and opened Kedron Lodge as a temporary Catholic Church.

On 25 November 1934, Duhig blessed and laid the foundation stone for the new St Anne's Catholic Church. On Sunday 19 May 1935 Duhig opened and dedicated the church, designed in the Spanish style and could accommodate 500 people. On Sunday 1 August 1937 Duhig blessed and opened the adjoining presbytery.

The Kalinga Scout group was formed in 1938. It now occupies the post office of the 17th Australian Personnel Staging Camp in Kalinga Park during World War II.

St Anne's Catholic School opened in February 1948 and closed in 1966.

In 1950 mechanic Henry William Endres of 51 Kent Street constructed a caravan from a disused aircraft.

In 1983, the Presbyterian Church and Hall in Emma Street were purchased by the Presbyterian Church of Eastern Australia (a separate Presbyterian denomination) as their Brisbane church.

The name Kalinga had been in use for the area for many years as a neighbourhood within the suburb of Wooloowin, but it was not until 16 October 2015 that Kalinga was officially gazetted as a suburb, having been excised from Wooloowin following requests from local residents.

Heritage listings 

Kalinga has a number of heritage-listed sites, including:
 100 Bertha Street: Kalinga Park
 123 Nelson Street: Kedron Lodge

Amenities 

St Anne's Catholic Church is at 127 Nelson Street.

Wooloowin Presbyterian Church  (formerly the Kalinga Presbyterian Church) is at 78 Emma Street. It is the only church in Queensland of the Presbyterian Church of Eastern Australia.

There are a number of parks in the area:

 Brook Road Park at 20 Terrace Street
Dalkeith Park at 98 Kent Road 
 Emma Street Park at 95 Emma Street
 Henry Street Park at 69 Shaw Road
 Kalinga Park at 48 Kalinga Street
 Melrose Park at 76 Rose Street
Nelson Street Park at 159 Nelson Street 
Kalinga Bowls Club is located within Melrose Park.

Kalinga Scouts have their hall in Kalinga Park near the Bertha Street entrance.

Education 
There are no schools in Kalinga. The nearest primary schools are Eagle Junction State School in neighbouring Clayfield to the south-east and Wooloowin State School in neighbouring Wooloowin to the south-west. The nearest secondary school is Kedron State High School immediately over the boundary to neighbouring Kedron to the south-west.

Notable residents 

 Justice Alfred Lutwyche

Gallery

References

External links 

 

Suburbs of the City of Brisbane